Dave Heine (born January 16, 1957) is an American politician and farmer who has served in the Indiana House of Representatives from the 85th district since 2016.

References

1957 births
Living people
Republican Party members of the Indiana House of Representatives
21st-century American politicians